Charles Thomas Bingham (16 April 1848, India – 18 October 1908 West Kensington, London) was an Irish military officer and entomologist.

Bingham was born in India of an old Irish family, and he was educated in Ireland. His military career began in India where he was a soldier in the Bombay Staff Corps and later with the Bengal Staff Corps. At first interested in ornithology he took up entomology from 1877 following a posting to Burma where he was also conservator of forests.

On his retirement in 1894 he settled with his wife and two sons (his three daughters married in India) in London. Here he worked, unpaid, in the Insect Room of the Natural History Museum, organising and cataloguing the world collection of aculeate Hymenoptera. He took over from William Thomas Blanford the editorship of two of  the Hymenoptera volumes of The Fauna of British India, Including Ceylon and Burma series and two of the butterfly volumes.

He was elected a fellow of the Entomological Society of London in 1895 and was a member of its council from 1903 to 1906. In the same year he became a fellow of the Zoological Society of London.

Works
He collaborated with other naturalists across India to produce his works on the Indian Lepidoptera and Hymenoptera.

The Fauna of British India, Including Ceylon and Burma. Hymenoptera. Volume 1. Wasps and Bees. London: Taylor and Francis (1897).
The Fauna of British India, Including Ceylon and Burma. Hymenoptera, Volume 2. Ants and Cuckoo-wasps. London: Taylor and Francis (1903).
The Fauna of British India, Including Ceylon and Burma. Butterflies Volume 1. London: Taylor and Francis (1905).
The Fauna of British India, Including Ceylon and Burma. Butterflies Volume 2. London: Taylor and Francis (1907)

He also extensively improved on the earlier published information from Frederic Moore and Lionel de Nicéville. The following is from his preface to the butterflies volume of The Fauna of British India, Including Ceylon and Burma:

Named for Bingham
Several species of ants and wasps are named after him including Tetraponera binghami, Aenictus binghami and Vespa binghami.

Collections
His Hymenoptera are in the Natural History Museum, London, with duplicates in the Natural History Museum, Berlin. The Lepidoptera were scattered and presumably sold. His Parnassius, the snow Apollo butterflies, are in Ulster Museum, Belfast.

References

Sources
Anonymous 1909: "Bingham, C.T." Entomologist's Monthly Magazine (3) 45

External links
 The Fauna of British India, Including Ceylon and Burma.
 Butterflies. Volume 1 Volume 2
 Hymenoptera. Volume 1 Volume 2 Volume 3

1848 births
1908 deaths
Irish entomologists
Hymenopterists
Fellows of the Zoological Society of London
Fellows of the Royal Entomological Society
Bengal Staff Corps officers
Bombay Staff Corps officers
Naturalists of British India